Sekolah Menengah Kebangsaan Simpang Rengam or its short name is "SMK Simpang Rengam", is a secondary school located in Jalan Johor, Simpang Renggam. It is located close to Sekolah Kebangsaan Simpang Rengam and SK Dato' Onn Jaafar. There are two sessions, morning session for students from Form 3 to Form 5 and evening session for students from Form 1 and Form 2.



Performance
SMK Simpang Renggam has consistently been one of the top performing schools in Kluang in Sijil Pelajaran Malaysia and excelled in sporting competitions in the area.

Facilities

SMK Simpang Renggam has a canteen, a hall, a small mosque and six blocks of building.  In 2017, a new four story block was opened to accommodate the administration office and science lab, physics lab, classroom and presentation room.

History

The school was built in 1998 to accommodate the rising population in the area and provide education to Simpang Renggam residents. A football game sized field and dorms for boarding students were built. A canteen, a hall and a small mosque were built in order to accommodate student needs during school session. In 2017, a new four story block was opened.

Yearbook

SMK Simpang Renggam yearly edition of yearbook is called "Majalah Prestij". The yearbook include the photograph of school staffs, students from each class and achievements during the last 12 months. In 2020, SMK Simpang Renggam released a digital video yearbook on the school YouTube Channel due to the ongoing COVID-19 pandemic in Malaysia.

External links 
 SMK Simpang Renggam Facebook
 SMK Simpang Renggam Blogspot
 SMK Simpang Renggam YouTube

Kluang District
Schools in Johor